The Forest Lodge Library is located in Cable, Wisconsin. It was added to the National Register of Historic Places in 2001. Additionally, it is on the registry of historic buildings for Wisconsin.

History
The library was built in 1925. It was designed in part by Allen H. Stem of Reed and Stem. In addition to be a library, to building has also served as a meeting place for the local Lutheran church. It became a public library in 1969.

References

Library buildings completed in 1925
Libraries on the National Register of Historic Places in Wisconsin
Public libraries in Wisconsin
Reed and Stem buildings
National Register of Historic Places in Bayfield County, Wisconsin